This is a list of 115 species in Baconia, a genus of clown beetles in the family Histeridae.

Baconia species

 Baconia adebratti Caterino and Tishechkin, 2013 i c g
 Baconia aenea Caterino and Tishechkin, 2013 i c g
 Baconia aeneomicans (Horn, 1873) i c g b
 Baconia angulifrons Caterino and Tishechkin, 2013 i c g
 Baconia angusta Schmidt, 1893 i c g
 Baconia animata Caterino and Tishechkin, 2013 i c g
 Baconia anthracina Caterino and Tishechkin, 2013 i c g
 Baconia applanatis Caterino and Tishechkin, 2013 i c g
 Baconia atricolor Caterino and Tishechkin, 2013 i c g
 Baconia aulaea Caterino and Tishechkin, 2013 i c g
 Baconia azuripennis Caterino and Tishechkin, 2013 i c g
 Baconia barbarus (Cooman, 1934) i c g
 Baconia bigemina Caterino and Tishechkin, 2013 i c g
 Baconia brunnea Caterino and Tishechkin, 2013 i c g
 Baconia bullifrons Caterino and Tishechkin, 2013 i c g
 Baconia burmeisteri (Marseul, 1870) i c g
 Baconia carinifrons Caterino and Tishechkin, 2013 i c g
 Baconia castanea Caterino and Tishechkin, 2013 i c g
 Baconia cavei Caterino and Tishechkin, 2013 i c g
 Baconia cavifrons (Lewis, 1893) i c g
 Baconia chatzimanolisi Caterino and Tishechkin, 2013 i c g
 Baconia chilense (Redtenbacher, 1867) i c g
 Baconia choaspites Lewis, 1901 i c g
 Baconia chujoi (Cooman, 1941) i c g
 Baconia clemens Caterino and Tishechkin, 2013 i c g
 Baconia coerulea (Bickhardt, 1917) i c g
 Baconia crassa Caterino and Tishechkin, 2013 i c g
 Baconia cylindrica Caterino and Tishechkin, 2013 i c g
 Baconia deliberata Caterino and Tishechkin, 2013 i c g
 Baconia dentipes Caterino and Tishechkin, 2013 i c g
 Baconia diminua Caterino and Tishechkin, 2013 i c g
 Baconia disciformis Caterino and Tishechkin, 2013 i c g
 Baconia dives (Marseul, 1862) i c g
 Baconia emarginata Caterino and Tishechkin, 2013 i c g
 Baconia excelsa Caterino and Tishechkin, 2013 i c g
 Baconia eximia (Lewis, 1888) i c
 Baconia famelica Caterino and Tishechkin, 2013 i c g
 Baconia festiva Lewis, 1891 i c g
 Baconia foliosoma Caterino and Tishechkin, 2013 i c g
 Baconia fornix Caterino and Tishechkin, 2013 i c g
 Baconia fortis Caterino and Tishechkin, 2013 i c g
 Baconia fulgida (Schmidt, 1889) i c g
 Baconia furtiva Caterino and Tishechkin, 2013 i c g
 Baconia gibbifer Caterino and Tishechkin, 2013 i c g
 Baconia glauca (Marseul, 1884) i c g
 Baconia globosa Caterino and Tishechkin, 2013 i c g
 Baconia godmani (Lewis, 1888) i c
 Baconia gounellei (Marseul, 1887) i c g
 Baconia grossii Caterino and Tishechkin, 2013 i c g
 Baconia guartela Caterino and Tishechkin, 2013 i c g
 Baconia haeterioides Caterino and Tishechkin, 2013 i c g
 Baconia illustris (Lewis, 1900) i c g
 Baconia incognita Caterino and Tishechkin, 2013 i c g
 Baconia insolita (Schmidt, 1893) i c g
 Baconia irinae Caterino and Tishechkin, 2013 i c g
 Baconia isthmia Caterino and Tishechkin, 2013 i c g
 Baconia jacinta Caterino and Tishechkin, 2013 i c g
 Baconia jubaris Lewis, 1901 i c g
 Baconia katieae Caterino and Tishechkin, 2013 i c g
 Baconia kubani Caterino and Tishechkin, 2013 i c g
 Baconia leivasi Caterino and Tishechkin, 2013 i c g
 Baconia lescheni Caterino and Tishechkin, 2013 i c g
 Baconia lewisi Mazur, 1984 i c g
 Baconia longipes Caterino and Tishechkin, 2013 i c g
 Baconia loricata Lewis, 1885 i c g
 Baconia lunatifrons Caterino and Tishechkin, 2013 i c g
 Baconia maculata Caterino and Tishechkin, 2013 i c g
 Baconia maquipucunae Caterino and Tishechkin, 2013 i c g
 Baconia micans (Schmidt, 1889) i c g
 Baconia mustax Caterino and Tishechkin, 2013 i c g
 Baconia navarretei Caterino and Tishechkin, 2013 i c g
 Baconia nayarita Caterino and Tishechkin, 2013 i c g
 Baconia nebulosa Caterino and Tishechkin, 2013 i c g
 Baconia oblonga Caterino and Tishechkin, 2013 i c g
 Baconia obsoleta Caterino and Tishechkin, 2013 i c g
 Baconia opulenta Caterino and Tishechkin, 2013 i c g
 Baconia patula Lewis, 1885 i c g
 Baconia pernix Caterino and Tishechkin, 2013 i c g
 Baconia pilicauda Caterino and Tishechkin, 2013 i c g
 Baconia piluliformis Caterino and Tishechkin, 2013 i c g
 Baconia plebeia Caterino and Tishechkin, 2013 i c g
 Baconia prasina Caterino and Tishechkin, 2013 i c g
 Baconia pulchella Caterino and Tishechkin, 2013 i c g
 Baconia punctiventer Caterino and Tishechkin, 2013 i c g
 Baconia purpurata Caterino and Tishechkin, 2013 i c g
 Baconia quercea Caterino and Tishechkin, 2013 i c g
 Baconia redemptor Caterino and Tishechkin, 2013 i c g
 Baconia repens Caterino and Tishechkin, 2013 i c g
 Baconia reposita Caterino and Tishechkin, 2013 i c g
 Baconia riehli (Marseul, 1862) i c g
 Baconia riouka (Marseul, 1861) i c g
 Baconia rossi Caterino and Tishechkin, 2013 i c g
 Baconia rubripennis Caterino and Tishechkin, 2013 i c g
 Baconia rufescens Caterino and Tishechkin, 2013 i c g
 Baconia ruficauda Caterino and Tishechkin, 2013 i c g
 Baconia salobrus (Marseul, 1887) i c
 Baconia sanguinea Caterino and Tishechkin, 2013 i c g
 Baconia sapphirina Caterino and Tishechkin, 2013 i c g
 Baconia scintillans Caterino and Tishechkin, 2013 i c g
 Baconia silvestris Caterino and Tishechkin, 2013 i c g
 Baconia slipinskii Mazur, 1981 i c g
 Baconia splendida Caterino and Tishechkin, 2013 i c g
 Baconia stephani Caterino and Tishechkin, 2013 i c g
 Baconia submetallica Caterino and Tishechkin, 2013 i c g
 Baconia subtilis Caterino and Tishechkin, 2013 i c g
 Baconia tenuipes Caterino and Tishechkin, 2013 i c g
 Baconia teredina Caterino and Tishechkin, 2013 i c g
 Baconia tuberculifer Caterino and Tishechkin, 2013 i c g
 Baconia turgifrons Caterino and Tishechkin, 2013 i c g
 Baconia varicolor (Marseul, 1887) i c g
 Baconia venusta (J. E. LeConte, 1845) i c g b
 Baconia violacea (Marseul, 1853) i c g
 Baconia viridimicans (Schmidt, 1893) i c g
 Baconia viridis Caterino and Tishechkin, 2013 i c g
 Baconia wallacea Caterino and Tishechkin, 2013 i c g

Data sources: i = ITIS, c = Catalogue of Life, g = GBIF, b = Bugguide.net

References

Baconia
Articles created by Qbugbot